Minibosses is an American progressive rock band originally from Northampton, Massachusetts and now located in Phoenix, Arizona. They are known for their video game music covers, which are instrumental rock variations of the theme music from classic Nintendo video games such as Mega Man, Metroid, and Castlevania. The Phoenix New Times awarded Minibosses their best cover band award in 2006.

History
From 1997 to 1999, guitarist Aaron Burke and drummer Matt Wood played in Jenova Project, one of the earliest video game cover bands, along with other friends from the same dorm at the University of Massachusetts Amherst. In January 2000, Burke and Wood recruited bassist Ben Baraldi to form Minibosses. Initially, the band played both video game covers as well as original songs, and self-released their first album, Minibosses, in September 2000. They were unsatisfied with the quality of this album and have since released new versions of their covers (as well as new covers) on the Minibosses/Penny Winblood split and Brass album. At the same time, they replaced their older songs, which had been freely available to download, with the newer versions found on Brass. From 2000 to present, the band has toured continuously while recording material for new albums.

Members

Current
Aaron Burke – guitar
Robin Vining – guitar
Steve Dueck – drums
Brendan Dueck – keyboards
Owen Dueck – drums
Jakob Dueck – bass

Former
Robert Kelly Turner – guitar (2010)
Ben Baraldi – guitar (2007–2010), bass (1999–2007)
John Lipfert – guitar (2004–2007)
Fred Johnson – guitar (2002–2004)
Richard Smaldone – guitar (2001–2002)
Matt Wood – drums (1999-2014)

Discography
Minibosses (Self-released on Kraid Records, 2000)
Minibosses (EP) (Self-released, 2004)
Live at the Middle East recorded at The Middle East nightclub (Self-released, 2004)
Minibosses/Penny Winblood (Forge Records, 2005)
Brass (Self-released, 2005)
Brass 2: Mouth (Released December 2, 2011)

References

Further reading
Borges, Mario Mesquita. "Minibosses". Allmusic. Retrieved May 9, 2005.

External links

General
Minibosses official web site
Minibosses forum
ReMixer profile at OverClocked ReMix

Minibosses EP Insert Credit review Sheffield, Brandon (Apr. 12, 2004)
Minibosses official MySpace

Interviews
"Nintendo Rocks!" Wired Magazine: Werde, Bill (Dec. 2002)
"Nintendo rocks!" Salon.com: Becker, Verne (Apr. 21, 2004)
"Rocking in the Key of Nintendo" NPR-All Things Considered: (Aug. 26, 2004)

1999 establishments in Massachusetts
American instrumental musical groups
American progressive rock groups
Indie rock musical groups from Massachusetts
Instrumental rock musical groups
Musical groups established in 1999
Musical groups from Massachusetts
Musical groups from Phoenix, Arizona
Nintendocore musical groups
Video game music cover bands